Amaila Falls is located on the Kuribrong River (Potaro-Siparuni Region), a tributary of the Potaro River in west central Guyana.

The river drops from the escarpment over Amaila Falls vertically approximately 200 feet (60 m), and continues in a series of rapids and falls for almost two miles before reaching placid water at an elevation of 175 feet. The total drop is about 1,200 feet (365 m). Waterfall is approximately 45 m wide, the volume is 64 m3/s. Waterfall has formed on the sandstones and conglomerates of Roraima Formation. During the course of the falls the river changes direction from east to north.

In the lower elevations the walls of the escarpment are flatter but these steepen sharply with elevation until the valley walls are nearly vertical at the top.

It is planned to build a power plant with a dam to generate electricity for the national grid and existing large mining operations, with future expansion capacity to power major industrial growth projects within Guyana. The project has the potential to produce 165 MW, sufficient to provide power to most existing users in the country. Planned with assistance from Norway, the project was disputed by the APNU+AFC.

References

Waterfalls of Guyana